Doctor Faustus (Johann Fennhoff) is a supervillain appearing in American comic books published by Marvel Comics. The character is depicted usually as an adversary of Captain America. An Austrian psychiatrist and criminal mastermind who employs psychological manipulation on his enemies, the character was created by writer Stan Lee and artist Jack Kirby, and first appeared in Captain America #107 (November 1968).

Johann Fennhoff appeared in the first season of the Marvel Cinematic Universe TV series Agent Carter, portrayed by Ralph Brown.

Publication history
Faustus' name comes from the famous character of Christopher Marlowe's Renaissance play The Tragical History of Doctor Faustus about a man who sold his soul to Lucifer in exchange for 24 years of service from a devil called Mephistophiles in order to gain all knowledge. This character predates the Christopher Marlowe play, in the legend built around the real-life Johann Georg Faust.

Fictional character biography
Johann Fennhoff was born in Vienna, Austria. He became a psychiatrist and criminal mastermind. He has proclaimed himself the "Master of Men's Minds", and is known for the use of psychological methods of combat. His plots typically involve manipulating his foes into positions where they will, essentially, kill themselves.

1960s
In his first appearance, Faustus induced nightmares and hallucinations in Captain America (Steve Rogers) in an attempt to drive him insane. However, he was easily bested in a physical confrontation.

1970s
It was later revealed that Faustus had been treating the amnesiac Peggy Carter, and captured Sharon Carter and Sharon's parents in an attempt to destroy Captain America. Faustus, with the help of Karla Sofen then acquired stolen weapons from Stark International with which he planned to threaten New York City, and organized a private flight of American criminals; however this plan was thwarted by Captain America.

Faustus is briefly able to control Spider-Man and use him in an attempt to introduce a "psychogenic additive" to a flu vaccine (which would permit hypnotic control of the public), but he is defeated.

Faustus is the mastermind behind the neo-Nazi group National Force, directing them behind the scenes. He is responsible for the creation of the Grand Director to lead the National Force, as well as brainwashing S.H.I.E.L.D. Agent Sharon Carter and programming Sharon to commit suicide, though Carter survives. Faustus also temporarily brainwashes Captain America and battles the latter and Daredevil. His legs were injured by falling gas canisters during this confrontation.

1980s
Faustus later mentally conditions Everyman to be his operative, later known as Zeitgeist. He used his absorbascan to draw in psychic power from other people in an attempt to mentally defeat Mister Fantastic and prove his worth to the Secret Empire. Everyman subsequently battles Spider-Man and Mister Fantastic, but they defeat him. When Richards subsequently seeks Everyman's backer, Faustus attempts to attack Richards psychologically by using elaborate androids to foster the illusion that Richards has killed the rest of the Fantastic Four. Richards sees through the ruse and causes Faustus himself to have a breakdown.

After recovering from his breakdown, Faustus then allies with the Red Skull, and aids in the villain's mansion. Faustus unsuccessfully attempts to coerce Captain America into committing suicide through the use of ghostly holograms.

2000s
Faustus is presumed dead for a number of years, but reappears, living undercover as a S.H.I.E.L.D. psychiatrist, employed by the Red Skull. He is tasked with manipulating Sharon Carter, and claims responsibility for Sharon's increasing romantic attachment to Steve Rogers. Faustus is responsible for manipulating Sharon Carter into assassinating Captain America following the 2006 storyline "Civil War". It is further revealed that the Captain America from the 1950s is alive and in Faustus's possession, recuperating slowly, and reconditioned to be an agent sent to attack the new Captain America (Bucky Barnes). The failure of this attack, and the ever-increasing verbal abuse of Faustus by the Red Skull and Arnim Zola, causes him to withdraw from the project, but not before freeing Sharon and giving crucial information about the Red Skull's plans to S.H.I.E.L.D.

2010s
Rogers, Falcon and Black Widow are instrumental in exonerating Barnes when the latter is tried for the crimes committed as the Winter Soldier, in light of the mind control to which Barnes was subjected. This is done in part with Faustus's testimony in the trial, and a demonstration of his mind-control abilities, which he displays by manipulating the prosecuting lawyer into attacking the judge.

Faustus is later revealed to have established a real estate development business based in Jersey City, New Jersey called Hope Yards Development Relocation Association, as a front for a Hydra cell. The cell's purpose is to implement Faustus's plan to market energy drinks and aerosol sprays laced with mind controlling nanomachines. The plot is foiled by teenaged Jersey City resident Ms. Marvel, as is Faustus's subsequent attempt at getting one of his minions elected mayor of Jersey City.

During the Secret Empire storyline, Doctor Faustus is part of the Hydra High Council that the new Madame Hydra is collecting to assist Steve Rogers, who had the man's history altered to be a HYDRA long-time sleeper agent since childhood by the Red Skull's clone using the powers of Kobik. an inadvertent side effect of Kobik's restoration of Rogers's youth. After Hydra's global takeover, Faustus is assigned the task of 'convincing' Sharon Carter of loving Rogers regardless of this new allegiance, but as the final battle commences, Sharon pretends to have been won over by Faustus and then shoots him. Sharon reveals that she spent months after Faustus used her to shoot Steve listening to recordings of his voice so that the doctor would never be able to control Sharon again.

Powers and abilities
Doctor Faustus has no superhuman powers but has a genius intellect, and is extremely charismatic and can modulate his voice in a highly persuasive manner. He has a doctorate in psychiatry.

Faustus regularly employs hologram projectors, hallucinogenic gas dispensers, androids, and elaborate props. He also hires henchmen to impersonate various people as a part of his scheme to affect his victims' minds.

Faustus has suffered extensive leg injuries, forcing him to use a cane or wheelchair for mobility. He can stand or walk without assistance for only a brief time.

Other versions
The Ultimate Marvel version of Doctor Faustus appears in Ultimate Comics: Armor Wars. Here, Johann Fennhoff became an information broker for the European underground superhuman mercenary community, stationing in Prague. At some point through an accident involving a dimensional portal, he wound up with a little entity living in his head.

In the alternate timeline of the 2005 House of M storyline, Dr. Faustus is a scientist working for the Army, heading up the research on battlefield confrontations.

In other media

Television
 Doctor Faustus appears in the Spider-Man and His Amazing Friends episode "Pawns of the Kingpin", voiced by Dennis Marks. This version works for the Kingpin.
 Johann Fennhoff appears in the first season of the Marvel Cinematic Universe (MCU) series Agent Carter, portrayed by Ralph Brown. This version is an operative of Leviathan from the late 1940s and of Russian origin. Introduced under the alias of Dr. Viktor Ivchenko, he participates in Leviathan's plot to frame Howard Stark for selling his technology on the black market before Fenhoff is eventually defeated by Peggy Carter, arrested by the Strategic Scientific Reserve (SSR), and outfitted with a special gag. While imprisoned, he receives a cellmate in Arnim Zola, who recruits him into Hydra.
 While Fenhoff does not appear in the MCU series Agents of S.H.I.E.L.D., present day Hydra members Daniel Whitehall and Sunil Bakshi utilize the "Faustus Method" to hypnotize individuals to their cause.
 Doctor Faustus appears in the Avengers Assemble episode "New Year's Resolution", voiced by Mick Wingert. This version hails from 1949 and is an enemy of Howard Stark and Peggy Carter.

Video games
Doctor Faustus appears in Marvel's Midnight Suns. This version is a member of Hydra who seeks to use a combination of magic and science to resurrect Lilith and bring her under Hydra's control. While he succeeds in the former, he is killed by Crossbones to keep the Midnight Suns and the Avengers from learning her plans.

References

External links
 
 Doctor Faustus on Comic Vine

Characters created by Jack Kirby
Characters created by Stan Lee
Comics characters introduced in 1968
Fictional Austrian people
Fictional psychiatrists
Marvel Comics male supervillains
Marvel Comics neo-Nazis
Marvel Comics supervillains
Villains in animated television series